Lorentz Johannes Alexander Berger, (born 28 July 1991), who uses his given name Lorentz as a stage name, is a rap artist from Stockholm, Sweden, rapping in Swedish.

Raised on Södermalm, Stockholm, he became part of the Grammis winning duo Lorentz & Sakarias together with his brother Sakarias Berger. He has also collaborated with jj, Say Lou Lou, JaQe, Duvchi, Joy. In 2014 he made his solo-debut and released his album Kärlekslåtar which he won a Grammis for Best HipHop/Soul of The Year.

On 16 June 2017, Lorentz released his second album, Lycka Till.

On 15 May 2020, Lorentz released his third album, Krig och Fred.

Discography

Albums

References

1991 births
Living people
Swedish rappers
Swedish-language singers
Musicians from Stockholm